Bettié Department is a department of Indénié-Djuablin Region in Comoé District, Ivory Coast. In 2021, its population was 69,640 and its seat is the settlement of Bettié. The sub-prefectures of the department are Bettié and Diamarakro.

History
Bettié Department was created in 2008 as a second-level subdivision via a split-off from Abengourou Department. At its creation, it was part of Moyen-Comoé Region.

In 2011, districts were introduced as new first-level subdivisions of Ivory Coast. At the same time, regions were reorganised and became second-level subdivisions and all departments were converted into third-level subdivisions. At this time, Bettié Department became part of Indénié-Djuablin Region in Comoé District.

Notes
 

Departments of Indénié-Djuablin
States and territories established in 2008
2008 establishments in Ivory Coast